Tales from the Nightside is a collection of stories by American writer Charles L. Grant.  It was released in 1981 and was the author's first book by Arkham House and was published in an edition of 4,121 copies. The book cover has been featured on Thrash Metal band Sepultura album Beneath the Remains.

Contents

Tales from the Nightside contains the following stories:

 "Foreword", by Stephen King
 Tales from Oxrun Station
 "Coin of the Realm"
 "Old Friends"
 "Home"
 "If Damon Comes"
 "A Night of Dark Intent"
 Tales from Hawthorne Street
 "The Gentle Passing of a Hand"
 "When All the Children Call My Name"
 "Needle Song"
 "Something There Is"
 Tales from the Nightside
 "Come Dance With Me on My Pony's Grave"
 "The Three of Tens"
 "Digging"
 "From All the Fields of Hail and Fire"
 "The Key to English"
 "White Wolf Calling"

Sources

1981 short story collections
Fantasy short story collections
Horror short story collections
Books with cover art by Michael Whelan